A Time of Gifts (1977) is a travel book by British author Patrick Leigh Fermor. Published by John Murray when the author was 62, it is a memoir of the first part of Fermor's journey on foot across Europe from the Hook of Holland to Constantinople in 1933/34. The book has been hailed as a classic of travel writing; William Dalrymple called it a "sublime masterpiece".

A Time of Gifts, whose introduction is a letter to his wartime colleague Xan Fielding, recounts Leigh Fermor's journey as far as the Middle Danube. A second volume, Between the Woods and the Water (1986), begins with the author crossing the Mária Valéria bridge from Czechoslovakia into Hungary and ends when he reaches the Iron Gate, where the Danube formed the boundary between the Kingdom of Yugoslavia and Romania. A planned third volume of Leigh Fermor's journey to its completion in Constantinople was never completed.  In 2011 Leigh Fermor's publisher John Murray announced that it would publish the final volume, drawing from his diary at the time and an early draft that he wrote in the 1960s; The Broken Road, edited by Artemis Cooper, was published in September 2013.

Description
Many years after his travel, Leigh Fermor's diary of the Danubian leg of his journey was found in a castle in Romania and returned to him. He used it in his writing of the book, which also drew on the knowledge he had accumulated in the intervening years.

In the book, he conveys the immediacy of an 18-year-old's reactions to a great adventure, deepened by the retrospective reflections of the cultured and sophisticated man of the world which he became. He travelled in Europe when old monarchies survived in the Balkans, and remnants of the ancient regimes were to be seen in Austria, Czechoslovakia and Hungary. In Germany Hitler had recently come to power but most of his atrocities were not yet evident.

The title comes from "Twelfth Night", a poem by Louis MacNeice.

Honours
1978: WH Smith Literary Award

References

1977 non-fiction books
British travel books
John Murray (publishing house) books